Boerne is a city in and the county seat of Kendall County, Texas, in the Texas Hill Country. Boerne is known for its German-Texan history, named in honor of German author and satirist Ludwig Börne by the German Founders of the town. The population of Boerne was 10,471 at the 2010 census, and in 2019 the estimated population was 18,232. The city is noted for the landmark U.S. Supreme Court case City of Boerne v. Flores. Founded in 1849 as "Tusculum", the name was changed to "Boerne" when the town was platted in 1852.

Boerne is part of the San Antonio–New Braunfels metropolitan statistical area.

History

Boerne came into being as an offshoot of the Texas Hill Country Free Thinker Latin Settlements, resulting from the Revolutions of 1848 in the German states. Those who came were Forty-Eighters, intellectual liberal abolitionists who enjoyed conversing in Latin and who believed in utopian ideals that guaranteed basic human rights to all. They reveled in passionate conversations about science, philosophy, literature, and music. The Free Thinkers first settled Castell, Bettina, Leningen, and Schoenburg in Llano County. These experimental communities were supported by the Adelsverein for one year. The communities eventually failed due to lack of finances after the Adelsverein funding expired, and conflicts of structure and authorities. Many of the pioneers from these communities moved to Sisterdale, Boerne, and Comfort.

In 1849, a group of Free Thinker German colonists from Bettina camped on the north side of Cibolo Creek, about a mile west of the site of present Boerne. They named their new community after Cicero's Tusculum home in ancient Rome. In 1852, John James and Gustav Theissen, who helped settle Sisterdale, platted the townsite, renamed it in honor of German author Karl Ludwig Börne, with the Anglicized spelling of "Boerne". The town was not incorporated until 1909. August Staffell was the original postmaster in 1856.

During the Civil War, Boerne voted against secession and was a mostly pro-Union town; many communities in Kendall County were part of the formation of the Union League, which supported the Union and Abraham Lincoln.

The 1870 limestone courthouse, second-oldest in Texas, was designed by architects Philip Zoeller and J. F. Stendebach, and stands directly across the street from the current 1998 courthouse designed by architects Rehler, Vaughn & Koone, Inc.

In March 1887, the San Antonio and Aransas Pass Railway came to town. The coming of the railroad was an economic boost of some magnitude, and it created better conditions for the area.

In the late 1870s, retired British army officers, including Glynn Turquand and Captain Egremont Shearburn, played one of the first polo matches in the United States in Boerne. The polo ground is still visible on Balcones Ranch, bought by Captain Turquand in 1878.

Boerne's robust environment encouraged the health resort industry. Sisters of the Incarnate Word founded the St. Mary's Sanitarium in 1896 for pulmonary patients; Dr. W.E. Wright contracted with the Veterans Administration in 1919 to provide care for World War I veterans suffering from lung ailments; the William L. Sill Tuberculosis Resort operated northwest of Boerne; and Mrs. Adolph (Emilie) Lex opened her home to recovering patients, eventually converting two rooms into operating rooms.

Karl Degener organized the Boerne Gesang Verein (singing club) and the Boerne Village Band in 1860. The family and descendants of Sisterdale resident Baron Ottomar von Behr have included three generations of directors of the Boerne Village Band, and four generations of musicians. The band is billed as the "Oldest Continuously Organized German Band in the World outside Germany", and in 1998 the Federal Republic of Germany recognized the Boerne Village Band for its contribution to the German heritage in Texas and America.

Geography
Boerne is located in southern Kendall County in the Texas Hill Country. Interstate 10 and U.S. Route 87 pass through the city south and west of its center, with access from Exits 537 through 543. I-10/US-87 lead southeast  to downtown San Antonio and northwest  to Comfort, where the highways diverge.

Cibolo Creek, a  tributary of the San Antonio River, flows through the city.

They are both actively growing limestone-solution caves.

Climate 
Boerne has a typical central Texas humid subtropical climate (Köppen Cfa) with hot, frequently humid summers and winters that average mild, but vary from hot to cold. Although 46.1 mornings per year fall below freezing, snowfall is extremely rare: between 1971 and 2000, the median was zero and the mean . The absolute hottest temperature has been  on August 23, 1925.

Summer weather is very hot, and can be either dry or humid: 91.6 afternoons reach above , although only 3.6 afternoons reach . In contrast, no rain fell between June 27 and August 31 of 1993, with only  between June and August 1910.

Demographics

2020 census

As of the 2020 United States census,  17,850 people, 5,547 households, and 3,891 families resided in the city.

2000 census
As of the census of 2000, 6,178 people, 2,292 households, and 1,613 families resided in the city. The population density was 1,061.1 people per square mile (409.9/km2). The 2,466 housing units averaged 423.5 per square mile (163.6/km2). The racial makeup of the city was 94.76% White, 0.36% African American, 0.37% Native American, 0.16% Asian, 0.02% Pacific Islander, 3.29% from other races, and 1.05% from two or more races. Hispanics or Latinos of any race were 19.44% of the population.

Of the 2,292 households, 36.0% had children under 18 living with them, 57.0% were married couples living together, 10.8% had a female householder with no husband present, and 29.6% were not families. About 25.7% of all households were made up of individuals, and 13.4% had someone living alone who was 65 or older. The average household size was 2.56 and the average family size was 3.10.

In the city, the population was distributed as 26.0% under 18, 6.7% from 18 to 24, 26.7% from 25 to 44, 23.0% from 45 to 64, and 17.6% who were 65 or older. The median age was 39 years. For every 100 females, there were 84.9 males. For every 100 females age 18 and over, there were 80.1 males.

The median income for a household in the city was $80,500 and for a family was $50,903. Males had a median income of $35,039 versus $25,773 for females. The per capita income for the city was $23,251. About 6.5% of families and 9.8% of the population were below the poverty line, including 14.5% of those under age 18 and 7.6% of those age 65 or over.

Boerne is home to two public high schools and one private high school. Students located south of Texas State Highway 46 attend Boerne Samuel V. Champion High School, a 5A high school named after a well-liked administrator for the Boerne Independent School District. Opening in 2008, Samuel V. Champion High School is attended by students who matriculate from Boerne Middle School-South.

Students zoned north of Texas Highway 46 attend Boerne High School. A 4A public high school, Boerne High School is smaller than Champion. Boerne High School is a well-regarded public high school and attended by students who come from Boerne Middle School-North.

Boerne is also home to the Geneva School of Boerne. Unlike Boerne Champion and Boerne High School, Geneva is a private high school with an annual tuition of $11,235. Geneva competes in the Texas Association of Private and Parochial Schools at the 4A level.

Attractions

Hill Country Mile
Created in the early 2010s, the Hill Country Mile is a  walking path following River Road Park and historic Main Street. The path was created as a catalyst to unify and preserve the rich cultural identity of downtown Boerne. It was also created to increase and foster economic growth through downtown shopping and culture centers.

Cibolo Nature Center
The center was first opened to the public on Earth Day in 1990 after founder Carolyn Chipman Evans urged the City of Boerne to preserve marshland around Boerne City Park. It is maintained through a 501c3 nonprofit organization called the Friends of the Cibolo Wilderness. Trails are open every day from 8 am until 5 pm. City Park is in a unique natural setting, as it shares a border with Cibolo Creek.

Boerne City Lake Park 
Formed by the John D. Reed Dam, Boerne City Lake was completed and opened to the public in 1978. The primary purpose of the project was to provide some flood control for Cibolo Creek, and to supplement the fresh water supply for the city. The lake has around 100 acres of water and an associated watershed of 12,560 acres. Motorized boats not permitted on the water.

Cascade Caverns

Cascade Caverns opened to the public in 1932 and began having private tours in the 1870s. Stories say that the cave was known particularly to the adventurous young men of Kendall County and a hermit, who hid in a cave at the time of the war.

Education
It is in the Boerne Independent School District.

Notable people
 Michelle Beadle, TV sports personality
 Jacobs Crawley, rodeo world champion
 Ann B. Davis, actress; The Brady Bunch (1969–1974), interred in the Saint Helena's Columbarium and Memorial Gardens
Bill Goldberg, professional wrestler
Herb Hall, jazz clarinet player
 Susan Howard, actress; Dallas (1979–1987)
 George Wilkins Kendall, journalist, Mexican–American War correspondent, and founder of The New Orleans Picayune
 Cheryl Ladd, actress; Charlie's Angels (1977–1981)
 Maggie Lindemann, singer and songwriter
 Grace Phipps, actress; Fright Night (2011), The Nine Lives of Chloe King (2011), The Vampire Diaries (2012), Teen Beach Movie (2013), and Teen Beach 2 (2015)
 Tammie Jo Shults, commercial airline pilot, former Lieutenant commander for the United States Navy Reserve
 George Strait, singer, songwriter, and actor
 Jimmy Walker, PGA Tour golfer
 Matthew O. Williams, Congressional Medal of Honor recipient

See also
 Kendall County Courthouse and Jail

References

External links

 Official website
 Boerne Chamber of Commerce
 Boerne Kendall County Economic Development Corporation
 

 
Cities in Kendall County, Texas
Cities in Texas
County seats in Texas
German-American culture in Texas
German-American history
Latin Settlement
Greater San Antonio